The Secret Adventures of Jules Verne is a Canadian science fiction television series that first aired in June 2000 on CBC Television in Canada.  The series first ran in the United States on cable on The Sci-Fi Channel (now Syfy), and lasted for one season. The show is a fictionalized telling of the life of French author Jules Verne, placing him into the settings of the stories he wrote such as Twenty Thousand Leagues Under the Seas and Around the World in Eighty Days.

Plot
The show features a fictionalized portrayal of French author Jules Verne (Chris Demetral), along with portrayals of the characters Jean Passepartout (Michel Courtemanche) and Phileas Fogg (Michael Praed), both originating from Verne's 1873 work Around the World in Eighty Days. A new character is also created for the show: Phileas Fogg's cousin Rebecca (Francesca Hunt). The show's premise is of a young Verne being placed into scenarios similar to those of his stories prior to his having written them. Many of the show's settings are portrayed via special effects and computer-generated imagery. Publicity for the show described its imagery as being steampunk.

Production
The show was filmed in Montreal, Quebec at an estimated cost of $30,000,000 CAD. According to the Montreal Gazette, it was the most expensive television series ever shot in the city. English screenwriter Gavin Scott, who created the series, worked with producer Michael Mullally and production company Talisman Films to create the show. Executive producer Pierre de Lespinois chose to film in Montreal due to the city's architecture. The Secret Adventures of Jules Verne was the first television series to be filmed entirely in high-definition video; specifically, it used the HDCAM, a digital camera manufactured by Sony.

Broadcast history
The show first aired on CBC Television in Canada in 1999, and was then broadcast in the United States on the Sci-Fi Channel (now Syfy) in 2001.

Critical reception
An uncredited review in the Times-Picayune rated the show 2.5 out of 4 stars, stating that "With its dark humor, odd machines of the Industrial Revolution, campy derring-do and attractive stars, The Secret Adventures of Jules Verne holds promise." Tom Shales of The Washington Post was less favorable, describing the show's premise as "silly" while also criticizing the directing, script, and characterization of Verne.

Episodes

Soundtrack
The series' main theme and incidental music was composed by Nick Glennie-Smith. In April 2011, Perseverance Records released a 2-CD soundtrack of the series' music. The soundtrack included the main theme, closing theme, "bumpers" (played at commercial breaks), and suites from every episode of the series apart from "The Book of Knowledge", for which the composer and the recording studio were unable to locate the original tapes.

References

External links

Science fiction Westerns
2000s Canadian science fiction television series
Steampunk television series
Television shows based on works by Jules Verne
CBC Television original programming
2000 Canadian television series debuts
2000 Canadian television series endings
Television shows based on Around the World in Eighty Days
Works based on Journey to the Center of the Earth
Television shows based on Twenty Thousand Leagues Under the Sea